Ronnie Joyner (born c. 1961) is an American former professional basketball player who spent 17 seasons playing in New Zealand in the National Basketball League (NBL). He finished his career as the league's all-time leading scorer with 8,828 career points.

High school and college career
Joyner attended Collierville High School in Collierville, Tennessee, where he averaged 18.1 and 21.5 points per game respectively during his final two prep seasons. As a freshman at Cloud County Community College in 1978–79, he averaged 23.8 points, including 37 points per game in his final eight games. He came back a year later and averaged 30.1 points per game, third among the nation's junior college scorers, and earned first-team JC All-America honors. Following his sophomore season, Joyner transferred to Washington State, where he was a streak shooter in his first season with the Cougars. He worked on his defensive game during his senior year, earning praise from head coach George Raveling. In 54 games for the Cougars over two seasons, he averaged 6.7 points and 2.6 rebounds in 18.0 minutes per game.

NBL career
Joyner moved to New Zealand in 1984. He was recruited by his former Washington State teammate Kenny McFadden when the Wellington Saints needed a replacement import on the eve of the 1984 NBL finals. He went on help the Saints win the championship. Joyner had his first full season in the NBL in 1985, playing for the Auckland-based Ponsonby. He averaged 52.6 points per game for the season, which saw him being named the NBL Most Outstanding Forward while earning NBL All-Star Five honors. He continued on with Ponsonby in 1986 and earned All-Star Five honors for the second straight year. After two more seasons with Ponsonby, he joined the Waikato Warriors for the 1989 season. After a season with the Auckland Cannons in 1990, he returned to Waikato for the next three seasons. Between 1994 and 1996, he played for the Hutt Valley Lakers. In 1997 and 1998, he played for the Northland Suns. After a season away from the NBL in 1999, he played for the North Harbour Kings in 2000 and 2001.

In his 17-year career, Joyner was a five-time league scoring champion. He retired with 291 games and a league-record 8,828 career points. He also ranked fifth all time in career rebounds (2,459).

References

External links
Clips of Joyner playing for Ponsonby:  

1961 births
Living people
African-American basketball players
American expatriate basketball people in New Zealand
American men's basketball players
Basketball players from Tennessee
Forwards (basketball)
Washington State Cougars men's basketball players
Wellington Saints players
21st-century African-American people
20th-century African-American sportspeople